A Childhood in Natashquan is a Canadian documentary film, directed by Michel Moreau and released in 1993. The film is a portrait of the childhood of influential Québécois singer-songwriter Gilles Vigneault in the remote northern Quebec town of Natashquan.

The film premiered as the closing film of the 1993 Rendez-vous du cinéma québécois.

The film was a Genie Award nominee for Best Feature Length Documentary at the 14th Genie Awards in 1993.

References

External links 
 

1993 films
1993 documentary films
Canadian documentary films
Documentary films about singers
French-language Canadian films
1990s Canadian films